Charles "Charley" Wilcoxon was an American drum teacher and drum method book writer. He wrote several influential books on rudimental drumming that are still used by drum teachers today. He is a member of the Percussive Arts Society Hall of Fame.

Bio

Charles Wilcoxon was born November 26, 1894 in Coshocton, Ohio, or possibly Newark, Ohio. He received his first drum in 1899 at the age of 5 and was taught basic music reading by his mother, a piano teacher. He began performing at the age of 8 in movie theaters around Coshocton. He started teaching at 12 and was touring at 14 with the vaudeville show "Spring Maid". Charles was a member of the touring orchestra for the D.W. Griffith movie “Intolerance.” From 1922 to 1933 he played at The Palace in Cleveland, as the house drummer. He then founded his own music store in the 1930s, where he lathed custom drum sticks. His books were originally written by hand as an aid for teaching private students at  Wilcoxon’s Drum Shop and Studio at the Arcade in Cleveland, and many of the solos were dedicated to specific students. Wilcoxon reportedly wrote all 150 solos for All-American Drummer in just six weeks. In addition to his several snare drum and drum kit publications, he wrote mallet etudes and solos for vibraphone and marimba, though these were never published. He played, including with the Cleveland Symphony Orchestra, taught, and authored instructional books until his death in Cleveland in 1978. He is quoted as often saying, "don't copy, be original." Charley was inducted into the Percussive Arts Society Hall of Fame in 1981 in the categories of Author, Education, Radio/TV, Rudimental, and Industry.  William J. Schinstine dedicated a solo to Wilcoxon in 1968 called Charlie's Horse. Also in 1968, Philly Joe Jones recorded the first 8 bars of the Wilcoxon solo “Rolling in Rhythm” as a break in the track “Trailways Express” on a solo album.

Notable students
Wilcoxon's students include drum set players like Philly Joe Jones, Joe Morello, Steve Smith (musician), John Bernard Riley, and Sadiq Abdu Shahid (formerly Archie Taylor Jr.), and orchestral percussionists such as Alan Abel (musician), Joseph Parlink  and Robert Hohner.

Publications
His books and solos are currently distributed by Ludwig Music

The All American Drummer
Modern Rudimental Swing Solos 
Wrist and Finger Stroke Control 
The Drummer on Parade 
Drum Method 
Rolling in Rhythm 
The Junior Drummer 
Drumming! Plus Hummin' a Tune

References 

1894 births
1978 deaths
20th-century American drummers
American male drummers
20th-century American male musicians